Konstantinovsky is an urban locality (an urban-type settlement) in Tutayevsky District of Yaroslavl Oblast, Russia. Population:

References

Urban-type settlements in Yaroslavl Oblast
Tutayevsky District
Romanovo-Borisoglebsky Uyezd